Cambio de Piel is the fourth studio album released on 9 October 2015 by Spanish singer-songwriter Bebe.

Track listing
 "Respirar"   (Bebe)
 "Borrones"  (Bebe)
 "La cuenta" (Bebe)
 "Que llueva"  (Bebe)
 "Bala perdida"  (Bebe)
 "Tan lejos tan cerca"  (Bebe)
 "Animales hambrientos"  (Bebe)
 "Chica precavida"  (Bebe)
 "Ganamos"  (Bebe)
 "Una canción" (Bebe)
 "Más que a mi vida" (Bebe)
 "Todo lo que deseaba"   (Bebe)

Charts

Weekly charts

Year-end charts

References

2015 albums
Bebe (singer) albums
Spanish-language albums